Measure problem may refer to:

Measure problem (cosmology), problem concerning how to compute fractions of universes of different types within a multiverse
 A problem in measure theorysee Solovay model
Klee's measure problem, problem of determining how efficiently the measure of a union of rectangular ranges can be computed
McNamara fallacy, a bias disregarding what cannot be easily measured

See also
Measurement problem in quantum mechanics